The Zamość uprising comprised World War II partisan operations, 1942–1944, by the Polish resistance (primarily the Home Army and Peasant Battalions) against Germany's Generalplan-Ost forced expulsion of Poles from the Zamość region (Zamojszczyzna) and the region's colonization by German settlers.

The Polish defense of the Zamość region was one of Poland's largest resistance operations of World War II.

German atrocities

In 1942, as part of Generalplan Ost, the Zamość region, with its fertile black soil, in the General Government, was chosen for further German colonisation. In fact the Zamość region expulsions and colonization can be considered the beginning of the large-scale implementation of the Generalplan Ost. The city itself was to be renamed "Himmlerstadt" (Himmler City), later changed to Pflugstadt (Plow City), which was to symbolise the German "plow" that was to "plow the East". The German occupiers had planned the relocation of at least 60,000 ethnic Germans to the area before the end of 1943. An initial "test trial" expulsion was performed in November 1941, and the whole operation ended in anti-partisan pacification operations combined with expulsions in June–July 1943 which were codenamed Wehrwolf Action I and II.

Over 110,000 Polish people from approximately 300 villages were expelled to make room for German (and to a lesser extent, Ukrainian) settlers as part of Nazi plans for establishment of German colonies in the conquered territories (Generalplan Ost). In the Warsaw or Lublin area some villagers were resettled, but about 50,000 of those expelled were sent as forced labour to Germany while others were sent to the Nazi concentration camps never to return. Some villages were simply razed and the inhabitants murdered.

4,454 Polish children were kidnapped by German authorities from their parents for potential Germanisation. Only 800 of them were found and sent back to Poland after World War II.

Polish resistance

Local people resisted the action with great determination; they escaped into forests, organised self-defence, helped people who were expelled, and bribed kidnapped children out of German hands. Units of Polish resistance (primarily of Armia Krajowa and Bataliony Chłopskie) as well as elements of Soviet partisans and the pro-Soviet Gwardia Ludowa helped to evacuate Polish civilians and assaulted German colonists and forces in the region. In December 1942 one of the first large partisan battles of World War II occurred in the region. The resistance forces numbered several thousand forest fighters. The first phase of the resistance took place from December 1942 to February 1943; the Germans then lessened their activities for a few months but counter-attacked in June, with major anti-partisan actions and terror directed against the civilian population (Aktion Wehrwolf).

After several battles between the partisans and the German units (the most notable being the battles of Wojda, Róża, Zaboreczno, Długi Kąt, Lasowce and Hrubieszów as well as the Battle of Osuchy), the Germans had to halt the action and in the end very few German settlers were brought to the area. Until the middle of 1943, the Germans managed to settle 9,000 colonists, and an additional 4,000 until the end of 1943. The increasing harassment from the partisans meant that the Germans began to lose the control of the region in the spring of 1943.

In the first half of 1944, Polish civilians and the Polish resistance were also attacked by Ukrainian units of the Ukrainian Insurgent Army (see massacres of Poles in Volhynia). Nonetheless, by the summer of 1944 the Polish partisans, based in the large forests of the region, had taken control of most of the countryside, limiting German control to the major towns. In the summer of 1944 Germans again initiated major anti-partisan operations (Sturmwind I and Sturmwind II) which resulted in the battle of Osuchy (one of the largest battles between the Polish resistance and Nazi Germany), with the insurgents sustaining heavy casualties. However, soon afterwards, in July, the remaining Polish units took part in the nationwide Operation Tempest and managed to liberate several towns and villages in the Zamość region. The Germans, pressured by the advancing Red Army, were forced to abandon the region.

Remembrance
Several monuments, museums and cemeteries have been raised in the area over time. In the People's Republic of Poland the actions of the communist Armia Ludowa were emphasized at the expense of those of the non-communist resistance. A recent Polish documentary dedicated to the uprising has been recognized in the New York Festivals of 2008 with a bronze medal.

See also
 Polish areas annexed by Nazi Germany
 Ethnic cleansing of Zamojszczyzna by Nazi Germany
 Operation Tannenberg
Pacifications of villages in German-occupied Poland
Nazi crimes against the Polish nation

Notes

References
 
 Joseph Poprzeczny, German order, dated 22 November 1943, for the ethnic cleansing of the Zamosc Lands issued by Odilo Globocnik, in Hitler's Man (2004).
 Andrzej Jerzy Krukowski, Powstanie Zamojskie 1942–1943 (The Zamość Uprising) at ZSP4Zamosc.edu.pl  
 "Bitwa o Zamojszczyznę"  
 Zygmunt Puźniak, POWSTANIE ZAMOJSKIE CZY JÓZEFOWSKIE?, Tygodnik Zamojski, 27 luty 2008.  
 Janusz Gmitruk, Powstanie Zamojskie, Muzeum Historii Polskiego Ruchu Ludowego, 2003, 
 Jan Grygiel, Związek Walki Zbrojnej i Armia Krajowa w Obwodzie Zamojskim 1939–1944, Polskie Wydawnictwo Naukowe 1985
 Walki oddziałów ZWZ-AK i BCh Inspektoratu Zamojskiego w latach wojny 1939–1944, Związek Żołnierzy Armii Krajowej Okręg Zamość 1990

Conflicts in 1944
Military operations involving the Polish resistance during World War II
Uprisings during World War II
History of Zamość
General Government
Ukrainian Insurgent Army